Fannie May Confection Brands, Inc. is an American chocolate manufacturer headquartered in Chicago and currently owned by Italian company Ferrero SpA. Fannie May manufactures a broad variety of products including enrobed, barks, caramels, squares, berries, twist wrapped, molded, flow wrapped, and boxed chocolates. In attempt to reach all consumers, Fannie May became allergy conscious, carrying candy without gluten, milk, honey, oil(s), wheat, eggs, etc. The Union of Orthodox Jewish Congregations of America certified many of Fannie May's products to be kosher as well.

History 
The first Fannie May shop was opened in 1920 by Henry Teller Archibald at 11 North LaSalle Street in Chicago. His Buttercreams are introduced and become an instant success.

In the midst of World War II, the ingredients for Fannie May's recipes were hard to come by. However, they refused to change their recipes, or compromise the quality of their products.

In the mid-1980s the company opened its first store in Missouri. By the end of the decade more than 250 locations, mostly still centered around the Midwest U.S., were in operation.  In 1992, the Archibald Candy Company expanded its business by acquiring chocolatier Fanny Farmer and its 200 retail stores in the northeastern United States as a sister brand to Fannie May.  

The acquisition proved too much for Archibald, which filed for bankruptcy and closed more than 200 of its retail stores.  An errant path of merger and acquisitions, whereby the company had become the largest chain of candy retailers in the country but without adequate financing and a viable corporate strategy, was blamed for the bankruptcy.  

In 2004 Alpine Confections purchased Archibald out of receivership, merged Fanny Farmer into Fannie May, and moved production to its own Green, Ohio-based Harry London Candies, which had been acquired a year earlier. Fanny May was reopened in October 2004 with 45 retail outlets.

In April 2006, Fannie May was sold for $85 million plus an earnout to publicly traded Internet retailer 1-800-Flowers.com.  The chocolates and candy continued to be manufactured Ohio under the name Fannie May Confections Brands Inc, while the Fanny May corporate headquarters remained in Chicago.

In March 2017 the Italian confectionery giant Ferrero SpA bought Fannie May and Harry London from 1-800-Flowers.com, for $115 million.  At the time Ferrero indicated that it hoped to expand Fannie May beyond its currently regional market.

Products
 1920 Buttercreams are introduced. 
 1946 The Pixie, the company’s most popular candy to date, is introduced.
 1963 The Mint Meltaway, a combination of dark chocolate and peppermint coated with chocolate or a green pastel confection, is introduced.
 1972 The Trinidad, a dark truffle center enrobed in white confection and toasted coconut, is introduced.
 1992 The Carmarsh, a combination of caramel, marshmallow, and chocolate, is introduced.

References

Further reading

External links
 
 Fannie May Confections, Inc. History
 Consumer M&A Article on Alpine Confection, Inc.'s Purchase of Fannie May

Companies based in Chicago
Economy of the Midwestern United States
Confectionery companies of the United States
American chocolate companies
Ferrero SpA